James Cant may refer to:

Jim Cant, Scottish footballer
Jimmy Cant, Australian soccer player
James Cant Ranch Historic District, in Oregon